Guntis is a Latvian masculine given name and may refer to:
Guntis Belēvičs (born 1958), Latvian politician
Guntis Džeriņš (born 1985), Latvian ice-hockey player
Guntis Endzels (born 1967), Latvian basketball coach
Guntis Galviņš (born 1986) Latvian ice-hockey player
Guntis Osis (born 1962), Latvian bobsledder and Olympic medalist
Guntis Peders (born 1973), Latvian track and field athlete, hurdler and Olympic competitor 
Guntis Rēķis (born 1974), Latvian luger and Olympic competitor
Guntis Sics (born ????), Australian sound engineer
Guntis Ulmanis (born 1939), Latvian politician, fifth President of Latvia 
Guntis Valneris (born 1967), Latvian draughts player

Latvian masculine given names